The Road River Group is a geologic group in Alberta. It preserves fossils dating back to the Ordovician period.

See also

 List of fossiliferous stratigraphic units in Alberta

References
 

Ordovician Alberta